Naomi Elizabeth "Nomy" Lamm (born September 1, 1975) is an American singer-songwriter and political activist. Lamm has described herself as a "bad ass, fat ass, Jew, dyke amputee." Her left foot was amputated at age three, to be fitted with a leg prosthesis, to treat a bone growth disorder. This trauma influenced Lamm's later work concerning body image. She is also known for her activism on the issue of fat acceptance.

Biography

1990s
Lamm was involved with musical theater during her youth.  She became part of the queercore scene in Olympia, Washington, where she performed with various musicians. In 1991 she published the first of three issues of a zine titled I'm So Fucking Beautiful. The zine's visual narrative of vulnerability deliberately counters its textual power where she expresses her anger at her treatment as a young fat woman.

In 1999, Lamm released a solo debut album of punk rock music with revolutionary themes, titled Anthem. Originally, the record company Talent Show sought to compile the work of the various bands with whom she performed as frontwoman, but Lamm chose to re-record the music as a solo project. Later in 1999, Lamm released The Transfused, a soundtrack to the anti-corporate rock musical that she created with The Need. Lamm also toured as part of Doctor Frockrocket's Vivifying Reanimatronic Menagerie and Medicine Show. Effigy, released by Yoyo Recordings, represented a departure for Lamm, with electronica replacing the sparse production of her previous work. "What I'm doing now is total disco-pop," she said at the time, "but it’s still punk because it was created through punk channels using punk ethics." Thematically, Effigy continued Lamm's call for a revolution, but this album's focus was on an internal, rather than external revolution.

2000s
Lamm continued to publish zines, and she also gave theatrical college lectures on fat oppression, sometimes dressed in fairy wings and waving a magic wand.  For this, Lamm was nominated for Ms. magazine's  "Woman Of The Year" award. Lamm also toured as part of the spoken word performance troupe, Sister Spit, and wrote as a regular columnist for Punk Planet magazine.

From January 2004 until May 2005, Lamm co-hosted a monthly genderqueer open mike variety show called The Finger with Ana Jae.  The show was held at a feminist sex toy store in Chicago, called Early to Bed, and it featured live poetry, improv, comedy, dance, storytelling, video exhibition, folk music, rock music, and performance art. The Finger was said to inspire local queer people to take artistic risks and express themselves freely.

Lamm's music is featured in the 2006 documentary, Young, Jewish, and Left. An interview with her about the connections between punk rock and Judaism appear in the DVD extras.  Lamm's most recent group musical venture is with the band Tricrotic with Marcus Rogers and Erin Daly. They have recorded one EP.

2010s
Her current music project is entitled nomy lamm & THE WHOLE WIDE WORLD. It is a platform for collaborations and workshops with other artists of any genre, such as Dylan Shearer, Mirah, Annah Anti-Palindrome, EPRhyme, and Felonious.

Lamm writes for make/shift magazine in the section called Dear Nomy.

Lamm directed the Artists in Residence Program for Sins Invalid, a non-profit arts organization in the Bay area that features performances about sexuality and disability and centralizes the work of people of color and queer people.

In 2012 Lamm was a keynote speaker at the biannual Femme Conference. She completed writing her first book, for her MFA, a series of short stories about trauma and transformation called 515 Clues.

, Lamm was writing a novel titled The Best Part Comes After the End.

Lamm held an artist talk and creative process workshop for students and the Olympia community on June 6, 2019, at the Kenneth J. Minnaert Center for the Arts Black Box Theater.

2020s
Lamm continues writing and performing with Sins Invalid and nomy lamm & THE WHOLE WIDE WORLD.

Lamm participated in a music video for the social-distancing-friendly music series Promising Notes — put together by the Olympia Downtown Alliance, Octapas Cafe and the City of Olympia's Artists on Board project.

Lamm continues writing and releasing music with her band, The Beauty. Their most recent release, "Honey", was written and recorded for the Sins Invalid production "We Love Like Barnacles: Crip Lives in Climate Chaos," which had streamed Oct 23, 24, 25, 2020.

Following a film screening of Sins Invalid's "Unshamed Claim to Beauty", Nomy participated in the Sins Invalid #NoBodyIsDisposable Film Panel (with ASL & embedded captions).

Personal life
Lamm identifies as a Jewish witch and is involved with Jewitch Camp, an organization of Jewish witches and Jewish pagans from the Reclaiming tradition of Wicca. She has been ordained as a Kohenet Priestess by the Kohenet Hebrew Priestess Institute and has created a divination deck for the Counting of the Omer between Passover and Shavuot. Lamm practices magic, reads tarot, and studies Kabbalah.

Lamm's totem animal is a seal. According to artist Riva Lehrer, "In the water [Lamm] feels both psychic and physical freedom. She is a strong swimmer, and in the water she moves from a state of impairment to one of dexterity. Seals are complex creatures in how they are perceived. Usually seen as cute and puppy-like with their enormous eyes and neotenous faces, seals are actually serious carnivores sporting large teeth and claws. Through her work Nomy Lamm also demonstrates a certain edge of danger. Her resonant, smoky, voice has a startling power, whether raised in song or when speaking as an activist for marginalized people."

Lamm lives on occupied Squaxin/Nisqually/Chehalis land in Olympia, Washington with her partner Lisa, their dogs Dandelion and Momma, and their cats Calendula and Chanukah.

Discography

Albums
Nobody Knows What We've Been Through, self-release 2008
Effigy, Yoyo Recordings, 2003
The Transfused, (with The Need), Yoyo Recordings, 2000
Anthem, Talent Show Records, 1999

Bibliography (illustrator)
 I'm Jay, Let's Play by Beth Reichmuth and Nomy Lamm

See also
Fat acceptance movement
Fat feminism
Gender fluidity

References

External links
Intercourse 2002: a Sex and Gender Spoken Word Recipe for Revolution Interview with the Portland Mercury

1975 births
Living people
Musicians from Olympia, Washington
American accordionists
American amputees
American feminists
American Wiccans
American punk rock singers
Fat acceptance activists
Women punk rock singers
Jewish American musicians
Lesbian feminists
American lesbian musicians
LGBT Jews
American LGBT rights activists
American LGBT singers
Riot grrrl musicians
Queercore musicians
Jewish feminists
Jewish American writers
Third-wave feminism
Postmodern feminists
Jews in punk rock
Amputee musicians
21st-century accordionists
21st-century American women musicians
21st-century American singers
21st-century American women singers
Reclaiming (Neopaganism)
Wiccans of Jewish descent
Wiccan feminists
American priests
Wiccan priestesses
Feminist musicians
20th-century American LGBT people
21st-century American LGBT people
American anarchists